Khesht (also known as Khisht) is a city and capital of Khesht District, in Kazerun County, Fars Province, Iran.  At the 2006 census, its population was 10,332, in 2,257 families.

References

Populated places in Kazerun County

Cities in Fars Province